Wilderness therapy, also known as outdoor behavioral healthcare, is a treatment option for behavioral disorders, substance abuse, and mental health issues in adolescents. Patients spend time living outdoors with peers. Reports of abuse, deaths, and lack of research into efficacy have led to controversy.

Overview

The term "wilderness therapy" is sometimes used interchangeably with "challenge courses, adventure-based therapy, wilderness experience programs, nature therapy, therapeutic camping, recreation therapy, outdoor therapy, open-air therapy and adventure camps". The lack of a consistent definition has created problems with comparing studies into the effectiveness of programs. To address this, an integrated definition of a wilderness therapy program is offered as one which "utilizes outdoor adventure activities, such as primitive skills and reflection, to enhance personal and interpersonal growth". Fermnee et al. further distinguish wilderness therapy from adventure therapy by placing it within wilderness settings where the location and remoteness becomes a central part of the procedure, while also separating wilderness therapy from other forms of wilderness-based behavioural programs through the "clinical and therapeutic methods" that are applied. In part, the lack of a concise definition comes from the different environments in which these therapies have developed: for example, within the US wilderness therapy can be seen to have emerged from youth camps and experiential education; in Scandinavia the approach is connected to the outdoor life tradition; while in Australia and Canada it is tied more to Indigenous practises.

Natalie Beck and Jennifer Wong in their 2020 paper "A Meta-Analysis of the Effects of Wilderness Therapy on Delinquent Behaviors Among Youth" offer three models of wilderness therapy: an expedition model, generally lasting for less than 8 weeks; a base camp model, where clients stay at at central location but engage in "short wilderness excursions"; and a long-term model, where clients engage in wilderness excursions but otherwise remain in a residential program.  In the expedition model, clients undergo an extended hiking trip, setting up camps in various locations as they are taught survival skills. With the base camp approach the clients stay at a central facility, but undertake wilderness excursions from that location which can last for multiple days. Finally, when using the long term model, clients stay at a "rural camp" for an extended period – potentially up to 2 years – and "a wilderness component is introduced in daily activities or in the facility setting".

In the US a large number of these programs are located in the state of Utah. Incidents of alleged and confirmed abuse and deaths of youths have been widely reported across many of these programs.

History

Many programs in the western United States started operating in the 1970s. Some were started by former students of Brigham Young University such program as the Aspen Achievement Academy and the School for Urban and Wilderness Survival which was located in the state of Idaho.

Theories and Techniques

Effectiveness

Critics say that the effectiveness of wilderness therapy is unclear, and that further scientific studies are needed.

One meta review concluded that wilderness therapy may reduce delinquent behaviors among young participants. 
Another review has suggested that for childhood cancer survivors, wilderness therapy programs could increase social involvement, self-esteem, self-confidence, self-efficacy, social support, and physical activity, and may decrease their discomfort and psychological distress. However, the majority of the articles included in the review did not assess possible safety issues for participants in wilderness programs, and the authors recommended that possible side effects be investigated further.

While there are often claims of treatment success, most participants in wilderness therapy programs do not return home after the programs are complete, instead remaining institutionalized in other treatment programs.

Clients
Many wilderness therapy programs are part of the troubled teen industry much like therapeutic boarding school and residential treatment centers. A study of adolescents sent to wilderness therapy and residential treatment programs in the United States found that clients tended to have "greater than average intelligence and academic achievement" in spite of often having issues with schooling (18% having been suspended and 12.7% expelled). Behaviors leading to a placement in these programs included defiance, substance abuse, school problems and running away, with clients often showing violent and criminal behaviours (44% had assaulted family or nonfamily members), and "approximately a third" of those sent to the centers reported self-harm including suicide attempts. Other programs, though, have focused on different groups such as cancer survivors, people with diabetes and clients with disabilities.

Consent
One study found that, among the 17 surveyed US Outdoor Behavioral Healthcare Programs, about half of the therapy participants attended involuntarily and were transported by teen escort company. A "remarkably low" proportion of these participants return home after taking part in the programs, with most youths remaining institutionalized in some form of therapeutic program after the Outdoor Behavioral Healthcare program is complete. Participants are less likely to return home after treatment if they were involuntarily transported to the program than if they enrolled voluntarily.

Costs
Costs can vary, but in the US they "can cost upwards of $50,000 per stay". In 2016 the American Hospital Association recognised wilderness therapy as a viable treatment model and provided an insurance billing code. This, along with the increasing use of national accreditation programs, has allowed some US providers to work with insurance companies to increase coverage for their programs, but insurance companies sometimes reject the claims "because there is not enough data to justify that the treatment is effective and that the cost is necessary for said treatment."

Regulation 
The  was formed to provide an industry oversight body.
In 2021, the state of Oregon implemented regulations on transportation, banning the use of Blindfolds, Hoods, and Handcuffs.

Controversy

Allegations of abuse, deaths, and lawsuits

Many abusive situations have been reported and children have died in wilderness therapy programs. Many participants also say that they are left with lifelong trauma from the experience.

 1990 - Kirsten chase died three days into the challenger wilderness program
 January 15, 1995 - Aaron Bacon dies from acute peritonitis whilst attending the north star wilderness program.
 September 18, 2002 - William Edward Lee after damage to Vertebral artery after being restrained
 May 27, 2002 - Erica Harvey died from heat stroke and dehrydration
 July 15, 2002 - Ian August died during a hike he was attending the skyline journey Wilderness therapy program
 In August 2002 -  11 teens were found in distress at a wilderness therapy program camp and taken into protective custody by Montana Department of Public Health and Human Services child and family services division
 March 23, 2003  - Cory Baines died after a tree limb fell on the tent during the Catherine Freer Wilderness Therapy program
 August 28, 2009 -  Sergey Blashchishen died from dehydration and hyperthermia whilst at sagewalk wilderness therapy program
 November 23, 2014 - Alec Lansing died from hypothermia and broken femur whilst trying to run away
 In December 2015 six students were evacuated from Open Sky Wilderness program and flown to Denver Colorado with frostbite, The Open Sky Wilderness program Is accreddited by Outdoor Behavioral Healthcare Council, Association for Experiential Education, and the department of human services for Colorado and Utah.

Maia Szalavitz, author of the 2006 book Help at Any Cost: How the Troubled-Teen Industry Cons Parents and Hurts Kids, has concluded that many of the tactics that wilderness-therapy programs use are no different than those used at Guantanamo Bay. Szalavitz has documented cases of emotional and physical abuse, and the withholding of food, water, and sleep.

In October 2007 and April 2008, the United States Government Accountability Office convened hearings to address reports of widespread and systemic abuse in adolescent treatment facilities. In connection to the hearing, they issued a report about the wilderness therapy industry, in which thousands of allegations of abuse were examined. The Federal Trade Commission has published a list of questions for parents to ask when considering a wilderness program.

Due to the trauma and alleged harm reported by former wilderness program residents who have been forcibly escorted into placement, psychologists have heavily criticized this approach as inappropriate, and grossly inconsistent with establishing the necessary trust required for building a therapeutic relationship between youth and providers.

Staff qualifications 
In some programs, licensed mental health personnel are not employed to work directly with participants, ⁣ with programs instead hiring licensed mental health personnel as consultants or in other roles.

To be licensed in the counseling field, one must possess at least a master's degree in counseling, but much of the time these counselors are individuals without even a bachelor's degree. Some programs report having no licensed mental health professionals on staff. Some have argued that it is unethical for programs serving “high-risk” youth to deliver therapeutic services using less than professionally trained and credentialed mental health staff.

Some researchers have argued that national standards should be created with respect to the training, formal education, and licensure in therapeutic wilderness programs. Wilderness programs are not required to employ licensed workers, ⁣ and so the counselors may be unqualified to help adolescents in the programs to create therapeutic change.

After the program

After a wilderness therapy program, clients may return home (although this is not typical) or may be transferred to a therapeutic boarding school, young adult program, or intensive residential treatment center.

Notable former clients
 Chet Hanks
 Paris Hilton
 Elizabeth Gilpin 
 Members of Winthrop Rockefeller's family

See also 

 Outdoor education
 Experiential education
 Primitive skills
 Bushcraft
 Therapy
 Intervention (counseling)
 Group psychotherapy
 Educational consultant
 Ecopsychology
 Troubled teen industry

References

Further reading 
 Burke, Larry (October 1995) "Wilderness Education Gone Brutally Wrong", Outside. Retrieved December 25, 2022
 Cooper, Kelly-Leigh (June 19, 2001) "Troubled US teens left traumatised by tough love camps", BBC News Online. Retrieved December 25, 2022
 Canham, Matt (October 11, 2007) "Ten have died in wilderness therapy programs - and Congress wants to know why" The Salt Lake Tribune. Retrieved December 25, 2022
 
 
 
 

Alternative education
Behavior modification
Outdoor education
Psychotherapies
Psychology articles needing expert attention
Therapy
Medical controversies
Human rights abuses
Religion and mental health
Religion and science